Yuri Aleksandrovich Kovshov (born 5 September 1951) is a former Ukrainian Soviet equestrian and Olympic champion. He was born in Kushka, Turkmen SSR, and was affiliated with VDFSO Kiev. He won a gold medal in team dressage at the 1980 Summer Olympics in Moscow, and received a silver medal in individual dressage.

His grandson Maksim took part at several dressage championships in the early 2010s.

References

External links

1951 births
Living people
People from Mary Region
Soviet male equestrians
Ukrainian male equestrians
Ukrainian dressage riders
Olympic equestrians of the Soviet Union
Olympic gold medalists for the Soviet Union
Olympic silver medalists for the Soviet Union
Equestrians at the 1980 Summer Olympics
Equestrians at the 1988 Summer Olympics
Olympic medalists in equestrian
Medalists at the 1980 Summer Olympics
Honoured Masters of Sport of the USSR